Ryan Phinny (born October 31, 1989) is an American racing driver from Los Angeles, California.

Career 
After karting, Phinny made his Formula BMW USA debut in 2005 for Gelles Racing for two races and competed full-time in 2006 for Hearn Motorsports. He finished 9th in points with one podium finish. He also drove in the Formula BMW World Final for Gelles and finished 23rd. He was away from racing in 2007. In 2008 he made six starts in the Rolex Sports Car Series' GT class for Matt Connolly Motorsports in their Pontiac GTO.R and finished 22nd in points. In 2009 he made two starts for the same team. He also drove in the American Le Mans Series' 2009 Sports Car Challenge of St. Petersburg with Panoz Team PTG. In 2010 he only participated in karting races. In 2011 he has made a surprise appearance in Indy Lights driving for Brooks Associates Racing at the Long Beach Grand Prix.

His father, Pat Phinny, was also a racing driver who competed in Formula Super Vee and made one Indy Lights start in 1987.

Racing Record

Career summary

American open-wheel results 
Indy Lights

(key) (Races in bold indicate pole position) (Races in italics indicate fastest lap) (Races with * indicate most race laps led)

References

External links
Ryan Phinny official website

1989 births
American racing drivers
Formula BMW USA drivers
Rolex Sports Car Series drivers
American Le Mans Series drivers
Indy Lights drivers
Living people
Racing drivers from Los Angeles
International Kart Federation drivers

Bryan Herta Autosport drivers
Belardi Auto Racing drivers